Niccolò Caetani di Sermoneta (1526–1585) was an Italian Roman Catholic cardinal and bishop.

Biography
Niccolò Caetani was born in Rome on 23 February 1526, the son of Camillo Caetani, 3rd duke of Sermoneta, a cousin of Pope Paul III, and his second wife, Flaminia Savelli. His families were patricians from Naples. He was the uncle of Cardinal Enrico Caetani.

At the age of 10, Pope Paul III made him a cardinal deacon in pectore in the consistory of 22 December 1536. On 5 March 1537 he became administrator of the Diocese of Bisignano. His elevation to the cardinalate was published in the consistory of 13 March 1538; he received the red hat and the deaconry of San Nicola in Carcere on 16 April 1538.

On 8 August 1539 he was elected Bishop of Conza. He was promoted to the metropolitan see of Capua on 5 May 1546. He resigned the administration of Bisignano on 13 March 1549.

He participated in the papal conclave of 1549-50 that elected Pope Julius III.

He became administrator of the see of Quimper on 14 July 1550. On 9 March 1552 he opted for the deaconry of Sant'Eustachio.

He participated in both the papal conclave of April 1555 that elected Pope Marcellus II and the papal conclave of May 1555 that elected Pope Paul IV. He later participated in the papal conclave of 1559 that elected Pope Pius IV.

On 7 January 1560 he was named governor of Cesi, Terni. He resigned the administration of Quimper on 5 April 1560. He participated in the papal conclave of 1565-66 that elected Pope Pius V. In 1570, he became cardinal protector of the Kingdom of Scotland. He participated in the papal conclave of 1572 that elected Pope Gregory XIII.

On 6 January 1577 to 8 January 1578 he was the Camerlengo of the Sacred College of Cardinals.

He participated in the papal conclave of 1585 that elected Pope Sixtus V. He died on the day of the papal coronation, 1 May 1585. His body was transferred to Loreto and he is buried there in the Basilica della Santa Casa.

Episcopal succession
While bishop, he was the principal consecrator of:
Giulio della Rovere, Archbishop of Ravenna (1566);
Giovanni Francesco Gàmbara, Bishop of Viterbo e Tuscania (1566);
Iñigo Avalos de Aragón, Bishop of Mileto (1566); and
Guglielmo Sirleto, Bishop of San Marco (1566).

See also
Catholic Church in Italy

References

1526 births
1585 deaths
16th-century Italian cardinals
16th-century Italian Roman Catholic archbishops
Clergy from Rome